Wish is the fourth studio album by the German pop rock band Reamonn. It was recorded in 2006 and released on 21 April 2006 through Universal Music. All tracks were written by Rea Garvey, Mike Gommeringer, Uwe Bossert, Philipp Rauenbusch and Sebastian Padotzke, the members of Reamonn.

The album was produced in Los Angeles with producer Greg Fidelman, who had previously worked with Red Hot Chili Peppers and Johnny Cash.

Singles

"Promise (You and Me)" was released as a maxi single from the album on 24 March 2006. It was accompanied by a music video, filmed in Ireland and reminding of a Lord of the Rings scenery. The song has charted in Germany at number 17, in Austria at number 29, and in Switzerland at number 35.

"Tonight" was released as the second single on 7 July 2006. The song charted at number 11 in Germany, number 28 in Austria, and at number 20 in Switzerland.

"The Only Ones" was the third single to promote the album, released on 8 December 2006. It featured Lucie Silvas. The song charted at number 23 in Germany, number 26 in Austria, and number 32 in Switzerland. The single contained a B-side titled "Never Lettin' Go (Good Times)".

"Serpentine" was the fourth and final single from the album, released on 25 May 2007. It featured Lenny Castro on shakers. "Serpentine" charted at number 38 in Germany, and number 66 in Austria.

Commercial performance

In Germany, the album spent 15 weeks on the charts peaking at number 2.  In Switzerland, it reached number 2, spending a total of 33 weeks on the charts.  In Austria, it peaked at number 13 during a 15-week stay on the chart.

Track listings

Personnel

Additional musicians
 Lenny Castro – percussion

Technical personnel
 Greg Fidelman – mixing, production
 Mike Terry – engineering
 Jim Monti – engineering
 Dan Monti – additional engineering
 Paul Figueroa – additional engineering, assistant engineering
 Jason Mott – assistant engineering
 Stephen Marcussen – mastering
 Cindi Peters – production coordination

Charts and certifications

Weekly charts

Certifications

Release history
The release history of the versions of the album in three published countries.

Wish Live

Wish Live is a live album, released in Germany, Austria and Switzerland on 1 June 2007 in the CD/DVD format. It contained twelve tracks and one bonus track. It was recorded during the 2006 Wish Tour in Germany. Lucie Silvas toured with Reamonn during the Wish Tour, and performed solo and with the band.

Track listing

References

External links
 Reamonn: Wish at Last.fm
 Reamonns Official English Website

Reamonn albums
2006 albums
Albums produced by Greg Fidelman